The 2007 Italian Formula Three Championship was the 43rd Italian Formula Three Championship season. It began on 1 April at Adria and ended on 21 October at Monza after 16 races.

With victories at Adria, Misano, Vallelunga and Autodromo Nazionale Monza, Paolo Maria Nocera of Lucidi Motors finished the season as champion. He finished 21 points clear of Europa Corse driver Efisio Marchese, who won three races during the season. Third place went to Alan Racing driver Pablo Sánchez López, who also took three victories at Misano, Mugello, and Varano. Fourth place in the championship was claimed by Corbetta Competizioni's Mirko Bortolotti, who won the race at Mugello, while fifth went to his team-mate Fabrizio Crestani.

Teams and drivers
All teams were Italian-registered and all cars competed on Michelin tyres.
{|
|

Calendar
All rounds were held in Italy.

Standings
Points are awarded as follows:

References

External links
 Official website

Italian Formula Three Championship seasons
Formula Three
Italian
Italian Formula 3 Championship